Victory Avenue is a road in Mong Kok, Kowloon. It begins at Argyle Street, and ends at Waterloo Road. There are a number of pet shops along the road, as well as restaurants due to the large number of schools around the area.

References 

Roads in Kowloon
Kowloon